The Hegau is an extinct volcanic landscape in southern Germany extending around the industrial city of Singen (Hohentwiel), between Lake Constance in the east, the Rhine River in the south, the Danube River in the north and the Randen—as the southwestern mountains of the Swabian Jura are called—in the west. It was first mentioned in A.D. 787 in the Latinised form in pago Egauinsse.

The most famous sight of the Hegau is the Hohentwiel, a volcanic stub. On top of the mountain lies Hohentwiel fortress.

The Hohentwiel is the southernmost of a row of volcanic stubs in the Hegau, including the Hohenkrähen, the Hohenstoffeln, and the Hohenhewen.

References

 
Regions of Baden-Württemberg
Natural regions of the Alpine Foreland